OGP may refer to:
 International Association of Oil & Gas Producers, a global forum for petroleum producers
 Open Graph Protocol, enables web developers to integrate their pages into Facebook's social graph.
 Open Graphics Project, open source architecture and standard for graphics cards
 Open Government Partnership, an international organization launched in 2011